Os Trapalhões e o Mágico de Oróz is the 1984 entry in the Brazilian comedy film series Os Trapalhões.  This is a parody of The Wizard of Oz (1939).  It was directed by Dedé Santana and Vitor Lustosa.  It injects elements and actors of Cinema Novo into family film to direct attention to the ongoing drought in the Northeast, an issue that remains unresolved. It was shot in the city of Orós, in the state of Ceará.

Overview
In addition to the regular members of Os Trapalhões—Renato Aragão, Dedé Santana, Mussum, and Zacarias—, Xuxa Meneghel, José Dumont, Joffre Soares, and Arnaud Rodrigues, who wrote the songs, also appeared.  Santana played the Cowardly Lion, a sheriff, Zacarias played the Scarecrow, and Mussum played Vat, a cachaça-filled variation on the Tin Woodman.  Xuxa plays Sheriff Lion's girlfriend, Aninha.  Aragão plays his regular protagonist, Didi Mocó.  Soares, best known for his work in Cinema Novo,  plays a judge who sentences Didi's fellow tramps Soró (Rodrigues) and Tatu (Dumont) to jail for stealing bread, while the Sheriff keeps Didi, the Scarecrow, and Vat in his charge to find water for the town.  It is said that certain unusual sertanejos  will come to the town and save them, and the travellers fit the bill, at least as an excuse to get rid of them and the cowardly sheriff.  All of the town's water is on the lush estate of Colonel Ferreira, who rations it, and tries to seduce Aninha with no success.  The Wizard of Oróz (Dary Reis) sends them to retrieve a water-spitting monster, in fact a giant faucet, that washerwomen in Rio de Janeiro utilize.

The film is also noted for its parody of the opening scene of Stanley Kubrick's 2001: A Space Odyssey, and for the cameo appearance of Tony Tornado as the leader of the vultures (deliberately replacing crows in the drought context) that terrorize the Scarecrow until they are eaten by the Tramps.  Also, it shows Aragão's Christian side—in the film, he kisses the feet of the statue of Jesus Christ in Rio de Janeiro, though he wanted to kiss the hand, and the film also depicts scenes of the Virgin Mary, played by Bia Seidl, riding upon a donkey to Bethlehem.

Reception
Rodrigo de Oliveira in his criticism for the Website Papo de Cinema wrote: "The year 1983 was problematic for the Trapalhões. (...) Six months after the fight, the quartet was again together, coproducing his new movie (... ) The split seems to have helped Directed by Dedé Santana and Victor Lustosa, the musical is one of the high moments of the movie troupe.

Cast
Renato Aragão as Didi Mocó
Dedé Santana as Cowardly Lion
Mussum as Tin Woodman
Zacarias as Scarecrow
Xuxa Meneghel as Aninha
Dary Reis as the Wizard of Oróz
José Dumont as Tatu
Arnaud Rodrigues as Soró
Maurício do Valle as Colonel Ferreira
Joffre Soares as Judge
Tony Tornado as Vulture's líder
Roberto Guilherme as Merchant
Dino Santana as Beatus of Desert
Bia Seidl as Virgin Mary
Fernando José
Wilson Viana

References

External links 
 

1980s musical comedy films
1984 films
1980s parody films
Brazilian musical comedy films
Films based on The Wizard of Oz
Films shot in Ceará
Os Trapalhões
Brazilian parody films
1984 comedy films
1980s Portuguese-language films